United Nations Security Council resolution 1505, adopted unanimously on 4 September 2003, after recalling Resolution 1503 (2003), the Council appointed Hassan Bubacar Jallow as Prosecutor at the International Criminal Tribunal for Rwanda (ICTR).

The Security Council noted the new position of Prosecutor at the ICTR created by Resolution 1503, and subsequently approved Hassan Bubacar Jallow's appointment for a four-year term, beginning on 15 September 2003.

See also
 List of United Nations Security Council Resolutions 1501 to 1600 (2003–2005)
 Rwandan genocide

References

External links
 
Text of the Resolution at undocs.org

 1505
2003 in Rwanda
 1505
September 2003 events